Sandra Stone (April 4, 1934 – February 27, 2018) was an Oregon-based visual and conceptual artist as well as a poet, playwright and author of literary fiction and nonfiction.

Life
Sandra Stone was born Alessandria Stone on April 4, 1934, in Portland, Oregon. She married Mel Peters in 1956 and changed her name to Sandra Peters. The couple had three children prior to their divorce. She had use Sandra Stone as her professional name.

Sandra Stone has received more than 35 commissions from major architectural firms to create art for both public interiors and the landscape. She describes her work as "creating metaphor for space through architectural concepts, context, and literary text."

She was awarded fellowships from Bread Loaf, Virginia Center for the Creative Arts, and Literary Arts Inc. In 2007 her writing won the Dana Award in Poetry. In 2000 her 24-word letter was chosen from among 7,500 entries as the winner of a one-time national competition sponsored by the Consulate-General of Japan and the US Postal Service. Her 1997 collection of poetry, Cocktails with Breughel at the Museum Café, was selected as the winner of a national manuscript competition. In 1998 Stone's book won the Oregon Literary Arts Book Award.

Her work has appeared in The Hudson Review, The New Republic, International Poetry Review, JAMA, The Midwest Quarterly, Denver Quarterly, The Southwest Review, and elsewhere.

She had lived in Portland, Oregon, and sometimes in New York City. She died in Portland, Oregon, on February 27, 2018, at the age 83.)

Awards
2015 Oregon Book Award Finalist: Absurdist or, Is It? [:] Angus L. Bowmer Award
2014 Artist's Repertory Theater: Awarded 501-C3 status for 3 inter-related comic operas
2013 Oregon Book Award Finalist: The Inmost House [:] Memory Making Journeying Dwelling
2013 Omnidawn Publishing Featured Poet: Two Treaties on Ecstasy + Creative Bio
2012 Winner: Hunger Mountain: Philosophic Lyric
 2011 Campbell Corner Philosophic Lyric
 2010 Lucille Medwick Award
 2007 Dana Award
 1998 Literary Arts Book Award for Poetry
 1997 General Services Administration National Design Award for literary narrative in the Mark O. Hatfield Federal Courthouse.
1993 Winner: University of Washington Press: National Broadside Competition

Books
A Sum of Whirligigs [:] Poems of World Pain
The Inmost House [:] Memory Making Journeying Dwelling

Plays
What Everything Is
POoF
An Imperfect Place to Dispose of Flies
Yes, Out

Composers
John Vergin
Theresa Koon

Librettist
Sandra Stone

Poems 
"Snow Whippets," PSA Lucille Medwick Award
 "The Sadness of Penmanship", Omnidawn Poetry Feature
"For a Friend Who Decided Early to Stop Dialysis", JAMA
 "Taking A Piece Of Paper To The Bodyshop For Advice", Poetry in Motion

Anthologies
 
 
 
 
 Aspects of Robinson

References

External links
 "Welcome to the Nye Beach Writers Series Past Presenter's Archive", Writers on the Edge
 "Poetry Feature: Sandra Stone"
 "Sandra Stone's personal website"

1934 births
2018 deaths
Writers from Portland, Oregon
American women poets
Jewish American writers
Jewish poets
21st-century American Jews
21st-century American women